|}

The Bobbyjo Chase is a Grade 3 National Hunt steeplechase in Ireland. It is run at Fairyhouse Racecourse in February, over a distance of about 3 miles and 1 furlong (5,029 metres) and during the race there are twenty fences to be jumped.

The race was first run in 2003 and is named after the racehorse, Bobbyjo, who won the 1999 Grand National. The race is seen as a key trial for the Grand National. It was previously contested at Grade 2 level before being downgraded to Grade 3 in 2017.

Records
Most successful horse (2 wins):
 Roi Du Mee – 2013, 2015
 Acapella Bourgeois - 2020, 2021 

Most successful jockey (4 wins):
 Ruby Walsh -  Prince De Beauchene (2012), On His Own (2014), Boston Bob (2016), Pleasant Company (2017) 

Most successful trainer (12 wins): 
 Willie Mullins – Hedgehunter (2005), Homer Wells (2007), The Midnight Club (2011), Prince De Beauchene (2012), On His Own (2014), Boston Bob (2016), Pleasant Company (2017), Belshill (2018), Rathvinden (2019), Acapella Bourgeois (2020, 2021), Kemboy (2023)

Winners

See also
 Horse racing in Ireland
 List of Irish National Hunt races

References

Racing Post:

National Hunt races in Ireland
National Hunt chases
Fairyhouse Racecourse
2003 establishments in Ireland
Recurring sporting events established in 2003